Emil Trenev (Bulgarian: Емил Тренев; born 12 September 1948) is an international volleyball coach from Bulgaria who won the bronze medal at the 2001 Women's European Volleyball Championship as Head Coach with the Bulgarian Team.
He is also a former Bulgarian volleyball player who played the Munich 1972 Summer Olympics and ranked 4th.

References
 

Olympic volleyball players of Bulgaria
Bulgarian volleyball coaches
1948 births
Living people
Volleyball coaches of international teams
Place of birth missing (living people)
Bulgarian men's volleyball players
Volleyball players at the 1972 Summer Olympics